Paul Imke (8 March 1892 – 3 April 1964) was a German footballer. He played club football with Leipziger BC, Hannover 96 and Eintracht Frankfurt. 

Paul Imke debuted in the first team of his hometown club SC Weißenfels aged 14. In 1908 he moved to local rivals Preußen Weißenfels. For professional reasons he moved to Leipzig where he played for Leipziger BC and later to BV Hannovera 1898 which later were part of a merger that saw the formation of Hannover 96. In Hannover he scored plenty of goals that led to call ups to North German selections. In 1919 his profession moved him to Frankfurt where he worked for the publishing house Tischbein where he was in charge for distribution and advertisement acquisitions. In Frankfurt he joined Frankfurter FV that soon became Eintracht Frankfurt. In 1922 he finished his active career but soon revived his playing career when the Riederwald based club was in relegation trouble. Two goals against Helvetia Bockenheim in 2-1 victory secured the stay in the league. For this service he was appointed as honorary club member and honorary captain for Eintracht Frankfurt.

Paul Imke was the publisher of the Eintracht club magazine and therefore nicknamed Annoncen-Imke (Advertisement Imke). His intermediations between sports and the business world brought many sports events to Frankfurt.

Honours  

 Kreisliga Nordmain
 Champion: 1919–20, 1920–21
 Runner-up: 1921–22

Sources

External links
 Paul Imke at eintracht-archiv.de

1892 births
1964 deaths
German footballers
Hannover 96 players
Eintracht Frankfurt players
Association football forwards
German publishers (people)